The following list of Finland international footballers covers all football players with 30 or more official caps for the Finland national football team. The players are listed here sorted first by the total number of caps, and then by last name.

Key

List of players 

.

References
RSSSF
Suomen Palloliitto
Suomen Jalkapallomuseo

 
Association football player non-biographical articles